Juris Ekmanis (2 December 1941 – 9 April 2016) was the President of Latvian Academy of Sciences (2004—2012).

Career
He was appointed Junior Research Associate at the Riga Polytechnical Institute from 1961 to 1986, and Professor from 1986 to 1994. He was visiting professor at Cornell University (Ithaca), Iowa State University (Ames), University of California, Berkeley, United States in 1974 and at Manchester University in 1993. In 1976 he became a visiting scientist at McGill University (Montreal).
In 1990 he became the Director of the Institute of the Physical Energetics at the Latvian Academy of Sciences, and he was the President of said academy from 2004 to 2012.

Honours and awards
 Order of the Three Stars (Latvia), 2009
 The Latvian Academy of Sciences Alfreds Vitols Prize, 1999

References

External links

 CV — Professor Juris EKMANIS
 Ирина Акопова, Науку уничтожить невозможно

1941 births
2016 deaths
Scientists from Riga
Latvian physicists
Riga State Gymnasium No.1 alumni
Academic staff of Riga Technical University
Academicians of the Latvian Academy of Sciences
University of Latvia alumni